Sheffield is a village in Lorain County, Ohio, United States, along the Black River. The population was 3,982 at the 2010 census.

Geography
Sheffield is located at  (41.448009, -82.083397).

Demographics

2010 census
As of the census of 2010, there were 3,982 people, 1,581 households, and 1,160 families living in the village. The racial makeup of the village was 89.3% White, 4.0% African American, 0.3% Native American, 2.7% Asian, 1.4% from other races, and 2.2% from two or more races. Hispanic or Latino of any race were 6.1% of the population.

There were 1,581 households, of which 26.9% had children under the age of 18 living with them, 63.3% were married couples living together, 6.9% had a female householder with no husband present, 3.2% had a male householder with no wife present, and 26.6% were non-families. 21.9% of all households were made up of individuals, and 10.7% had someone living alone who was 65 years of age or older. The average household size was 2.51 and the average family size was 2.94.

The median age in the village was 45.2 years. 20.2% of residents were under the age of 18; 6.2% were between the ages of 18 and 24; 23.2% were from 25 to 44; 34.2% were from 45 to 64; and 16.2% were 65 years of age or older. The gender makeup of the village was 49.3% male and 50.7% female.

2000 census
As of the census of 2000, there were 2,949 people, 1,089 households, and 866 families living in the village. The population density was 272.6 people per square mile (105.2/km). There were 1,147 housing units at an average density of 106.0 per square mile (40.9/km). The racial makeup of the village was 90.88% White, 4.27% African American, 0.10% Native American, 0.81% Asian, 0.10% Pacific Islander, 2.61% from other races, and 1.22% from two or more races. Hispanic or Latino of any race were 5.93% of the population.

There were 1,089 households, out of which 34.5% had children under the age of 18 living with them, 67.4% were married couples living together, 9.1% had a female householder with no husband present, and 20.4% were non-families. 16.5% of all households were made up of individuals, and 7.3% had someone living alone who was 65 years of age or older. The average household size was 2.71 and the average family size was 3.06.

In the village, the population was spread out, with 26.3% under the age of 18, 6.6% from 18 to 24, 29.3% from 25 to 44, 26.2% from 45 to 64, and 11.6% who were 65 years of age or older. The median age was 39 years. For every 100 females there were 94.4 males. For every 100 females age 18 and over, there were 95.2 males.

The median income for a household in the village was $59,816, and the median income for a family was $66,136. Males had a median income of $43,313 versus $35,174 for females. The per capita income for the village was $25,218. About 2.5% of families and 3.2% of the population were below the poverty line, including 5.1% of those under age 18 and none of those age 65 or over.

Education
Sheffield is served by the Sheffield-Sheffield Lake City Schools.

Notable person
 Lee Richmond, a 19th-century major league baseball pitcher and the first to ever throw a perfect game in the majors, was born in Sheffield.

References

External links

Villages in Lorain County, Ohio
Villages in Ohio
Populated places established in 1817
Cleveland metropolitan area
Western Reserve, Ohio